Katra Sambili is a Kenyan writer, thinker and poet. She is passionate about the empowerment of youth and women across Africa.

Personal life
Sambili is from Mogotio Constituency in Baringo County in Kenya.

Education
Sambili has a bachelor's degree from USIU-Africa. She earned a Master of Science in International Development from the School of Public Policy in University of Birmingham, UK in 2007. She is also a graduate of Harvard Kennedy School of Government and an Edward S. Mason Fellow. While studying at Harvard, Sambili continuously sought opportunities to promote the voice and agency of women. She established the Harvard Africa Women's Network (HAWN) for her Organizing People, Power and Change class with Professor Marshall Ganz. HAWN is a peer support network that facilitates skills training in public speaking, media and campaign management and policy analysis. HAWN's membership consists of a diverse group of 50 women who continue to support each other's growth and ideas through the mentorship program as well as the public speaking series which was launched in April 2016.

Sambili, who believes in the power of voice to generate agency among vulnerable groups, used the public speaking skills she gained from Professor Steve Jarding as a panelist and speaker at the 7th African Development Conference at Harvard.

Career

Before attending Harvard, Sambili served as the founding Head of Secretariat for the National Council on the Administration of Justice (NCAJ). NCAJ is Kenya's foremost justice sector coordinating mechanism. It formulates policies, reviews strategies  and mobilizes resources for the administration of justice. NCAJ works with 30 State and Non-State Agencies including the Judiciary of Kenya, the Kenya National Police Service, the Kenya Prisons Services, the Office of the Attorney General, and the Office of the Director of Public Prosecutions, as well as a host of Government Ministries, National Commissions, and NGOs focusing on Human Rights, Gender Equality and Land Reform. She also worked with various funds and programs of the United Nations including UN Women, UNDP, UNICEF and the United Nations Millennium Campaign. She is currently a research and communications consultant with the United Nations headquarters in New York City.

Poetry
In April 2011, while attending Bishop TD Jakes' inaugural Pastors and Leadership Conference in Orlando, Florida, Ms. Sambili learnt the importance of a leadership that listens. It was at this conference that she was greatly motivated to listen to the unspoken needs of her people and inspired to continue to write poetry for the overlooked and the downtrodden. A particular poem, "I am strong" was of growing importance to her family and friends who drew courage and encouragement from it.

Sports With A Goal Africa

In October 2010, Sambili launched Sports With A Goal Africa (SWAGA). She rolled out "Our Talent for Our Targets" and "Amani-Nyumbani" programmes for youth. This initiative drew its ideology from the harnessing power of sports to unify communities embroiled in conflict. Sports played an important role in unifying the members of warring communities in Kenya following the devastating violence that erupted after the disputed Kenya Presidential Election results in 2007. This was most exemplified by the patriotic reception of Kenyan athletes and champions of the 2008 Beijing Olympic Games.

References

Living people
People from Baringo County
Harvard Kennedy School alumni
Alumni of the University of Birmingham
Year of birth missing (living people)
Mason Fellows